"4 AM" is the jangly, alt-country-influenced third single taken from Cherry Ghost's top 10 debut album Thirst for Romance. Available on CD and 7" vinyl on September 24, 2007 as well as a digital download on October 8, 2007, the single follows the top 30 single "People Help the People" and debut single "Mathematics." The 7" vinyl single features an original demo of "Mary on the Mend," which bears little resemblance to the album version.

Although previous single "People Help the People" entered the UK singles chart at #27, "4 AM" failed to make the top 100 (entering at #128). Promotion for the album began to subside shortly thereafter. A music video was produced for the song, being the first video to feature the entire band.

Track listings
All songs written by Simon Aldred.

Promo CD (HVN171CDRP):
 Released in August 2007
 "4 AM" (Edit) – 3:06
 "4 AM" (Instrumental) – 3:42

CD (HVN171CD) & digital download (UK iTunes only):
 "4 AM" – 3:42
 "Creature of Moderation" – 3:03

7" vinyl (HVN171):
 "4 AM" – 3:42
 "Mary" (Demo) – 4:40

References

External links

"4 AM" single review, musicOMH.com

2007 singles
Cherry Ghost songs
Heavenly Recordings singles
2007 songs
Songs written by Cherry Ghost